The Verdi Range is a mountain range in Sierra County, California that rises to  above sea level.

References 

Mountain ranges of Northern California
Mountain ranges of Sierra County, California
Giuseppe Verdi